Raskildinskoye Rural Settlement (Uraskilt jal tărăkhĕ) is an administrative and municipal division (a rural settlement) of Alikovsky District of the Chuvash Republic, Russia. It is located in the western part of the district. Its administrative center is the rural locality (a selo) of Raskildino. Rural settlement's population: 1,366 (2006 est.).

Raskildinskoye Rural Settlement comprises five rural localities.

The Cheboksary–Yadrin and Cheboksary–Krasnye Chetai highways cross the territory of the rural settlement.

See also
Church of Christmas of the Virgin (Raskildino)

References

Notes

Sources

Further reading
L. A. Yefimov, "Alikovsky District" ("Элӗк Енӗ"), Alikovo, 1994.
"Аликовская энциклопедия" (Alikovsky District's Encyclopedia), authors: Yefimov L. A., Yefimov Ye. L., Ananyev A. A., Terentyev G. K. Cheboksary, 2009, .

External links
Official website of Raskildinskoye Rural Settlement 

Alikovsky District
Rural settlements of Chuvashia

